Upsilon (uppercase Υ, lowercase υ;  ýpsilon ) or ypsilon  is the 20th letter of the Greek alphabet.  In the system of Greek numerals,  has a value of 400. It is derived from the Phoenician waw .

Etymology
The name of the letter was originally just "υ" (y; also called hy, hence "hyoid", meaning "shaped like the letter υ"), but the name changed to "υ ψιλόν" u psilon 'simple u' to distinguish it from οι, which had come to have the same  pronunciation.

Pronunciation
In early Attic Greek (6th century BCE), it was pronounced  (a close back rounded vowel like the English "long o͞o"). In Classical Greek, it was pronounced  (a close front rounded vowel), at least until 1030. In ancient Greek, it occurred in both long and short versions, but Modern Greek does not have a length distinction.

As an initial letter in Classical Greek, it always carried the rough breathing (equivalent to h) as reflected in the many Greek-derived English words, such as those that begin with hyper- and hypo-. This rough breathing was derived from an older pronunciation that used a sibilant instead; this sibilant was not lost in Latin, giving rise to such cognates as super- (for hyper-) and sub- (for hypo-).

Upsilon participated as the second element in falling diphthongs, which have subsequently developed in various ways.

Correspondence with Latin Y

The usage of Y in Latin dates back to the first century BC. The latter pronunciation was the most common in the Classical period and was used mostly by uneducated people. The Roman Emperor Claudius proposed introducing a new letter into the Latin alphabet to transcribe the so-called sonus medius (a short vowel before labial consonants), but in inscriptions, the new letter was sometimes used for Greek upsilon instead.

Four letters of the Latin alphabet arose from it: and U , Y and, much later, V and W. In the Cyrillic script, the letters U (У, у) and izhitsa (Ѵ, ѵ) arose from it.

In some languages, including German and Portuguese, the name upsilon (Ypsilon in German, ípsilon in Portuguese) is used to refer to the Latin letter Y as well as the Greek letter.  In some other languages, the (Latin) Y is referred to as a "Greek I" (i griega in Spanish, i grec in French), also noting its Greek origin.

Usage 
 In particle physics the capital Greek letter ϒ denotes an Upsilon particle. Note that the symbol should always look like  in order to avoid confusion with a Latin Y denoting the hypercharge. This may be done either with a font such as FreeSerif or with the dedicated Unicode character U+03D2 ϒ.
 Automobile manufacturer Lancia has a model called the Ypsilon. See Lancia Ypsilon.
 In the International Phonetic Alphabet, the symbol  is used to represent a labiodental approximant.
 In astrophysics and physical cosmology, ϒ refers to the mass-to-light ratio.
 In statistics, it is sometimes used instead of v or nu to indicate degrees of freedom

Similar appearance
 A similar symbol  (Unicode ♈ U+2648) is used for the astrological sign of Aries.

Symbolism

Upsilon is known as Pythagoras' letter, or the Samian letter, because Pythagoras used it as an emblem of the path of virtue or vice. As the Roman writer Persius wrote in Satire III:

Lactantius, an early Christian author (ca. 240 – ca. 320), refers to this:

Character encodings

 Greek Upsilon

 Coptic Ua

 Latin Upsilon

 Mathematical Upsilon

These characters are used only as mathematical symbols. Stylized Greek text should be encoded using the normal Greek letters, with markup and formatting to indicate text style.

Notes

External links

 

Greek letters
Vowel letters